Markus Hoffmann (born 29 June 1972) is an Austrian football manager and former footballer who played as a forward.

External links
 

1972 births
Living people
Austrian footballers
FC Braunau players
SV Wacker Burghausen players
SV Seekirchen players
FC Spartak Moscow
Austrian expatriate sportspeople in Russia
Association football forwards
FC Basel non-playing staff
1. FC Union Berlin non-playing staff